The Annual Review of Food Science and Technology is a peer-reviewed scientific journal published by Annual Reviews. It releases an annual volume of review articles relevant to the field of food science. It has been in publication since 2010. The editor is David J. McClements. As of 2022,  Journal Citation Reports gives the journal a 2021 impact factor of  14.714, ranking it fourth of 143 journal titles in the category "Food Science & Technology".

History
The Annual Review of Food Science and Technology was first published in 2010 by the nonprofit publisher Annual Reviews. Its founding co-editors were Todd R. Klaenhammer and Michael P. Doyle. Following Klaenhammer's retirement, David J. McClements became co-editor in 2019.  As of April 2021, McClements is the sole editor. Though it was initially published in print, as of 2021 it is only published electronically. Some of its articles are available online prior to the volume publication date.

Scope and indexing
The Annual Review of Food Science and Technology defines its scope as covering significant developments relevant to food science, inclusive of disciplines such as food microbiology, food rheology, foodborne illness, food engineering, fermentation, nutritional genomics, novel foods, food processing, and food preservation. As of 2022, Journal Citation Reports lists the journal's impact factor as 14.714, ranking it fourth of 143 journal titles in the category "Food Science & Technology". It is abstracted and indexed in Scopus, Science Citation Index Expanded, Compendex, MEDLINE, and Embase, among others.

Editorial processes
The Annual Review of Food Science and Technology is helmed by the editor or the co-editors. The editor is assisted by the editorial committee, which includes associate editors, regular members, and occasionally guest editors. Guest members participate at the invitation of the editor, and serve terms of one year. All other members of the editorial committee are appointed by the Annual Reviews board of directors and serve five-year terms. The editorial committee determines which topics should be included in each volume and solicits reviews from qualified authors. Unsolicited manuscripts are not accepted. Peer review of accepted manuscripts is undertaken by the editorial committee.

Editors of volumes
Dates indicate publication years in which someone was credited as a lead editor or co-editor of a journal volume. The planning process for a volume begins well before the volume appears, so appointment to the position of lead editor generally occurred prior to the first year shown here. An editor who has retired or died may be credited as a lead editor of a volume that they helped to plan, even if it is published after their retirement or death. 

 Todd R. Klaenhammer and Michael P. Doyle (2010-2018; Klaenhammer retired in 2015; credited to 2018)
 Doyle and David Julian McClements (2019-2021)
 David Julian McClements (2022-)

Current editorial board
As of 2022, the editorial committee consists of the editor and the following members:

 Colin Hill
 Anne S. Meyer
 Casimir C. Akoh
 Jozef L. Kokini
 Mary Ann Lila
 Jochen Weiss
 Liangli Yu

References 

 

Food Science and Technology
Annual journals
Publications established in 2010
English-language journals
Food science journals